Whakamarama is a rural area in the Western Bay of Plenty District and Bay of Plenty Region of New Zealand's North Island.

It includes a section of State Highway 2 between Ōmokoroa and Te Puna that underwent major maintenance work in early 2020.

The area is dominated by orchards and avocado growers, and has been targeted by avocado thieves.

History and culture

Māori settlement

Whakamarama was one of the Māori villages attacked during the New Zealand Land Wars in 1867.

The event is marked with a commemorative pouwhenua at Tawhitinui Marae, unveiled on the 150th anniversary in April 2017.

Whakamārama is the Māori word for illumination or explanation.

Recent history

The Atrium Art Gallery opened in Whakamarama in May 2019. It featured a steampunk exhibition later that year.

A missing 85-year-old man was found dead in Whakamarama in July 2019.

In September 2019, police began pursuing a driver in Whakamarama, following through Te Puna before eventually stopping them with road spikes in Bethlehem.

A search operation was launched in Whakamarama in January 2020, after a Taraunga man went missing. The case was featured on Police reality TV series Police Ten 7 four months later, in May 2020.

Several fires broke out in early 2020 in a bark processing plant, a bark pile, a garage and rental home, and a large area of scrub.

Coronavirus pandemic

During the 2020 coronavirus lockdown, nine-year-old Whakamarama girl Lucinda Finnimore wrote a letter to Prime Minister Jacinda Ardern, asking if the Easter Bunny and Tooth Fairy were deemed essential workers during lockdown.

Ardern responded that they were essential workers, resulting in international media coverage from the Washington Post, the New York Times, CNN, BBC News,. and others.

Salon published an opinion piece, criticising American media for reporting Finnimore's question and Ardern's response, while failing to cover the pandemic in Asia, and what the United States could learn from what was happening in Asia.

Marae

Tawhitinui Marae is located in the Ōmokoroa area. It is a tribal meeting ground of the Ngāti Ranginui  of Pirirākau, and includes the Kahi meeting house.

In October 2020, the Government committed $68,682 from the Provincial Growth Fund to upgrade the marae, creating an estimated 13 jobs.

Education

References

Western Bay of Plenty District
Populated places in the Bay of Plenty Region
Populated places around the Tauranga Harbour